Ekaterina Zaikina (born 27 May 1990 in Tolyatti) is a Russian former ice dancer who also competed for Georgia. Early in her career, she competed for Russia with Matvei Matveev. From 2005 through 2007, she competed with Otar Japaridze for Georgia. They were two-time competitors at the World Junior Championships.

Programs 
(with Japaridze)

Results 
With Japaridze for Georgia:

References

External links
 

1990 births
Russian female ice dancers
Sportspeople from Tolyatti
Female ice dancers from Georgia (country)
Living people